Eralea albalineella is a moth in the family Cosmopterigidae. It is found in North America, where it has been recorded from West Virginia, South Carolina, Louisiana and Florida to Texas and California.

The wingspan is about 7 mm. Adults have been recorded on wing from April to July and in September and November.

References

Natural History Museum Lepidoptera generic names catalog

Cosmopteriginae